Years of Lead is a phrase used in several countries to refer to periods of history marked by military repression, political violence or terrorism.

Years of lead may refer to:

History 

 Years of Lead (Brazil), (Anos de Chumbo) from 1968 to 1974
 Years of Lead (Italy), (Anni di Piombo) 1960s–1980s
 Years of Lead (Morocco), (سنوات الرصاص Sanawāt ar-Ruṣāṣ or Années de Plomb) 1960s–1980s
 Dirty War, (Guerra Sucia or Años de Plomo) in Argentina, from 1976 to 1983

Films 
 Marianne and Juliane (German title: Die bleierne Zeit, 'The Years of Lead'), 1981 West German film